Sterdyń  is a village in Sokołów County, Masovian Voivodeship, in east-central Poland. It is the seat of the gmina (administrative district) called Gmina Sterdyń.

The village has a population of 814.

References

External links
 Jewish Community in Sterdyń on Virtual Shtetl

Villages in Sokołów County